Paige Quinn Monaghan (born November 13, 1996) is an American professional soccer player who plays for Racing Louisville FC in the National Women's Soccer League (NWSL). She played college soccer at Butler University.

Early years
Monaghan grew up in the Succasunna section of Roxbury, New Jersey, alongside her mother Christine, dad Jim, two brothers and one sister.  She attended Roxbury High School, where she played soccer for four years, scoring 68 goals in 45 appearances and earning the NJ.com's 2014 NJAC girls soccer Player of the Year award. She also played two years of high school basketball.  She hopes to one day become a sports broadcaster.

College career
Monaghan played four years for the Butler University Bulldogs, finishing her university career with 22 goals and 18 assists in 80 games played.  During her career at Butler she was twice named to the All-Big East First Team (2017, 2018) as well as being awarded the 2017 All-Big East Offensive Player of the Year.   Monaghan graduated from Butler with a degree in marketing.

Professional career

Sky Blue FC, 2019–2022
Monaghan was selected by Sky Blue FC with the 10th overall pick of the 2019 NWSL College Draft. In doing so she became the first player from Butler University to be drafted in the NWSL.   She signed with the club in February, 2019. Monaghan made her club regular season debut on April 13, 2019.

International career
Monaghan is a United States youth international at the U23 level.

Monaghan received her first call-up to the United States women's national soccer team in December 2019.

Career statistics 
As of April 20, 2019

C – NWSL 2020 Challenge Cup

F – NWSL 2020 Fall Series

References

External links
Sky Blue FC
 
 NWSL player profile

1996 births
Living people
American women's soccer players
National Women's Soccer League players
NJ/NY Gotham FC draft picks
NJ/NY Gotham FC players
Soccer players from New Jersey
People from Roxbury, New Jersey
Women's association football forwards
Butler Bulldogs women's soccer players
Sportspeople from Morris County, New Jersey